William Pearce may refer to:

Entertainment
 William Houghton Sprague Pearce (1864–1935), American artist
 Bill Pearce (1926–2010), American singer and trombonist
 Billy Pearce (born 1951), English actor and comedian

Politics
 Sir William Pearce, 1st Baronet (1833–1888), British politician, Conservative MP for Glasgow Govan, 1885–1889
 Sir William Pearce, 2nd Baronet (1861–1907), British politician, Conservative MP for Plymouth, 1892–1895
 William Pearce (Liberal politician) (1853–1932), British politician, Liberal MP for Limehouse, 1906–1922
 William Pearce (Australian politician) (1855–1922), member of the Tasmanian Parliament
 Bill Pearce (politician) (1894–1968), American politician in the state of Florida

Other
 William Pearce (civil engineer) (1848–1930), surveyor, statistician, planner and administrator in western Canada
 William Pearce (priest) (1744–1820), English clergyman and academic

See also 
 Pearce (surname)
 Pearce baronets
 William Pierce (disambiguation)